Christoffer Forsberg (born March 31, 1994) is a Swedish ice hockey player. He is currently playing with Malmö Redhawks of the Swedish Hockey League (SHL).

Forsberg made his Swedish Hockey League debut playing with Färjestad BK during the 2013–14 SHL season.

References

External links

1994 births
Living people
Färjestad BK players
Malmö Redhawks players
People from Östersund
Swedish ice hockey centres
Timrå IK players
Sportspeople from Jämtland County